The Department of Law of state of Tamil Nadu is one of the Departments of Government of Tamil Nadu

Objective of the Department 
The basic objective of the Department is:
 Wherever Legislation is necessary to implement the policy decision of the Government, the Law Department, puts it into legal shape in the form of a draft Bill in co-ordination with the administrative departments concerned.
 On passage of the Bill by the Legislative Assembly, Law Department pursues further action till it is published as an Act after assent by the Governor or the President, as the case may be. Where there is urgent need to make law when the Legislative Assembly is not in session and is prorogued, Ordinance is promulgated under Article 213 of the Constitution of India. 
 Further, one of the main roles of Law Department is advisory in nature. Law Department offers legal advice on  the issues referred to it by all the departments of Secretariat including Legislative Assembly Secretariat.
 Apart from this, the statutory rules, notifications and orders and the deeds wherein the State Government are a party are scrutinized with reference to the relevant legal provisions and settled by the Law department. 
 In all litigations, wherein the State Government are a party, the draft affidavits, draft counter affidavits, reply affidavits, etc. are scrutinized and settled by the Law Department
\

Sub - Departments

Undertakings & Bodies

Ministers for Law

See also 
 Government of Tamil Nadu
 Tamil Nadu Government's Departments
 Ministry of Law and Justice (India)
 Tamil Nadu Government Laws & Rules

References

External links
 https://web.archive.org/web/20121021093539/http://www.tn.gov.in/departments/law.html (Official Website of the Law Department, Tamil Nadu - 1)
 http://www.tn.gov.in (Official website of Government of Tamil Nadu)

Other Links

Tamil Nadu state government departments
Law of India